Father Gabriel, born Goderdzi Urgebadze (26 August 1929 – 2 November 1995) was a Georgian Orthodox monk venerated for his dedicated monastic life and piety. With many miracles ascribed to him, Gabriel's grave at Mtskheta has attracted an increasing number of pilgrims. The Georgian Orthodox Church officially canonized him as Holy Father St. Gabriel, Confessor and Fool for Christ (წმ. ღირსი მამა გაბრიელი აღმსარებელი-სალოსი), on 20 December 2012.

Biography 
Gabriel was born as Goderdzi Urgebadze in Tbilisi in the family of a Communist Party functionary, who was murdered in 1931. After a compulsory service in the Soviet army, he decided to join the monastic life and was tonsured a monk under the name of Gabriel in 1955. He made himself famous by setting fire to a banner depicting Vladimir Lenin during an International Workers' Day parade in downtown Tbilisi in 1965. He was arrested, tried, ruled to be psychotic, and confined to a mental hospital for seven months. An account of this incident was also published in the West, in the Orthodox zine Death to the World in 1994.

Gabriel spent much of his later life at the convent of Saint Nino, a nunnery attached to Samtavro Monastery in Mtskheta, an ancient town north of Tbilisi. He died there in 1995 and was buried at the Samtavro churchyard.

Veneration 

The monk Gabriel is believed by the Orthodox followers to have possessed powers of healing and prophecy, while his remains are considered to be incorrupt. The oil from a lamp which constantly burned at his tomb in Mtskheta was also considered to have been miraculous. The grave became an increasingly popular site of pilgrimage. In 2012, the Georgian Orthodox Church officially recognized him as a saint. In January 2014, rumors that Gabriel made the promise in a vision to a local nun in Mtskheta that two wishes would supposedly be granted to those who arrived at the tomb just before Orthodox Christmas on 7 January sparked mass pilgrimage to the saint's tomb so as extra police units had to be deployed to control traffic. The church officials and the nun eventually dismissed the rumors as false.

The relics of Gabriel were exhumed for reburial into a special crypt within the Samtavro monastery in February 2014. Prior to the reburial, his body was rested at four major Orthodox cathedrals in Georgia, attracting thousands of pilgrims from all over the country.

References

Further reading 
 
 "Confessor of Christ in present day Georgia", The Orthodox Word, 1992, USA

External links
Official website: www.monkgabriel.ge

1929 births
1995 deaths
20th-century Christian saints
Archimandrites
Ascetics
Christian monks from Georgia (country)
Eastern Orthodox saints
People from Tbilisi
Saints of Georgia (country)
Miracle workers
Yurodivy